Tarcísio Pereira de Magalhães Filho, usually known as Tarcísio Filho (São Paulo, August 22, 1964) is a Brazilian cinema and television actor.

Biography
He is the son of the actors Glória Menezes and Tarcísio Meira. He has two half brothers, sons from a previous marriage of Glória Menezes.

Personal life
Tarcísio is married to publicist Mocita Fagundes.

Career

Television

Films

References

External links
 

1964 births
Living people
Brazilian male film actors
Brazilian male telenovela actors
Brazilian people of Portuguese descent
Male actors from São Paulo